The 1994 Chicago White Sox season was the White Sox's 94th season in the major leagues, and their 95th season overall. They led the American League Central, 1 game ahead of the 2nd place Cleveland Indians with a record of 67-46, when the season was cut short by the 1994–95 Major League Baseball strike.

Michael Jordan 
After retiring from the National Basketball Association, Michael Jordan surprised the sports world by signing a contract with the Chicago White Sox. He was invited to spring training and was sent to the Birmingham Barons on March 31, 1994. Jordan has stated this decision was made to pursue the dream of his late father, who had always envisioned his son as a Major League Baseball player.

Offseason 
 October 13, 1993: George Bell was released by the Chicago White Sox.
 December 15, 1993: Julio Franco was signed as a free agent with the Chicago White Sox.
 December 22, 1993: Tim Raines signed as a free agent with the Chicago White Sox.
 December 28, 1993: Ron Coomer was traded by the Chicago White Sox to the Los Angeles Dodgers for Isidro Marquez.
 February 8, 1994: Carlos Lee was signed by the Chicago White Sox as an amateur free agent.
 January 26, 1994: Dane Johnson was signed as a free agent with the Chicago White Sox.
 March 1, 1994: Scott Sanderson was signed as a free agent with the Chicago White Sox.
 March 21, 1994: Paul Assenmacher was traded by the New York Yankees to the Chicago White Sox for Brian Boehringer.
 March 29, 1994: Mike Huff was traded by the Chicago White Sox to the Toronto Blue Jays for Domingo Martínez.

Regular season 
 July 15, 1994: During a game against the White Sox, Indians outfielder Albert Belle's bat was confiscated by umpire Dave Phillips. It was the result of White Sox manager Gene Lamont believing that the bat was corked. During the game, Indians pitcher Jason Grimsley removed a ceiling tile in his manager's office and clambered on top of an  cinder block. He replaced the corked bat with a conventional bat but the bat had Paul Sorrento's name on it. Belle was suspended for seven games.

By Friday, August 12, the White Sox had compiled a 67-46 record through 113 games. They were leading the AL Central Division and had scored 633 runs (5.60 per game) and allowed 498 runs (4.41 per game). Their hitters had also struck out just 568 times: the fewest in the Majors. While their pitchers combined for just 20 saves, they did have 9 shutouts, tying the Oakland Athletics for the most in the Majors, and hit only 17 batters: the fewest among all 28 teams.

Season standings

Record vs. opponents

Opening Day lineup 
 Tim Raines, LF
 Joey Cora, 2B
 Frank Thomas, 1B
 Julio Franco, DH
 Robin Ventura, 3B
 Darrin Jackson, RF
 Lance Johnson, CF
 Ron Karkovice, C
 Ozzie Guillén, SS
 Jack McDowell, P

Notable transactions 
 April 4, 1994: Pete Rose Jr. was signed as a free agent with the Chicago White Sox.
 April 12, 1994: Atlee Hammaker was signed as a free agent with the Chicago White Sox.
 April 21, 1994: Steve Sax was released by the Chicago White Sox.

Roster

Player stats

Batting 
Note: G = Games played; AB = At bats; R = Runs scored; H = Hits; 2B = Doubles; 3B = Triples; HR = Home runs; RBI = Runs batted in; BB = Base on balls; SO = Strikeouts; AVG = Batting average; SB = Stolen bases

Pitching 
Note: W = Wins; L = Losses; ERA = Earned run average; G = Games pitched; GS = Games started; SV = Saves; IP = Innings pitched; H = Hits allowed; R = Runs allowed; ER = Earned runs allowed; HR = Home runs allowed; BB = Walks allowed; K = Strikeouts

Awards and records 
 Lance Johnson, American League record, Led American League in triples for four consecutive seasons (1991–1994)
 Frank Thomas, Silver Slugger Award

Farm system

Notes

References 
 1994 Chicago White Sox at Baseball Reference

Chicago White Sox seasons
Chicago White Sox season
White